The Attorney General of Gibraltar is the chief legal advisor of HM Government of Gibraltar. He combines the functions of Attorney General and Director of Public Prosecution and is also an ex officio member of the Gibraltar Parliament. The Attorney General's Chambers have a number of Crown Counsel.

He is appointed by the Governor of Gibraltar, acting on the advice and recommendations of the Specified Appointments Commission, in accordance with the constitution.

List of attorneys general
Sir James Cochrane 1837–1841 (afterwards Chief Justice of Gibraltar, 1841)
Marcus Costello 1841–>1856
Frederick Solly-Flood 1866–1877
Robert French Sheriff 1877–>1890
Archibald Walter Fawkes  1892–?1902
Sir Bartle Frere 1911–1914 
Charles James Griffin 1914–1919
Maxwell Hendry Maxwell-Anderson 1919–1929
 (Sir)Ralph Hone 1933–1936 
Mansell Reece 1943
Lockhart-Smith 1944
Audley McKisack 1944–
Charles Campbell Ross (4 years) c.1947
Hubert James Marlowe Flaxman (acting), October–December 1955
Denys Roberts 1960–1962
Ashley Martin Greenwood 1963–
Cornelius Banahan O’Beirne c.1967
Hugh Hickling 1970–1972
David Hull QC, 1979-1984
Eric Thistlethwaite QC 1984-1989
Kenneth W Harris QC 1989-1992
Katie M Dawson QC, 1992-1995
Reginald "Ricky" Rhoda QC, 1995–2015
Michael Llamas QC, 2015–

References

Attorneys-General of Gibraltar